Serere Township Secondary School is a government sponsored, private coeducational secondary school in Serere, Eastern Uganda. The school caters for both boarding and day pupils. The lower secondary provides 4 years of schooling at the end of which students sit Uganda Certificate of Education (O-level) exams in up to 8 subjects. The upper secondary provides a further 2 years of schooling at the end of which students sit Uganda Advanced Certificate of Education (A-level) exams in up to 3 subjects.

Curriculum
The school curriculum includes:
Physics 
Chemistry
Biology
English Language
Mathematics
Christian Religious Education
Geography 
History 
Business Subjects
Computer Studies

Universal Secondary Education
The school participates in the Universal Secondary Education scheme whereby students who achieve specific grades in each of the four primary school-leaving exams study for free, and the Ugandan government pays the school an annual grant of USh  per eligible student.

Universal Post Ordinary Level Education and Training

Connecting Classrooms programme
The school took part in the British Council's Connecting Classrooms programme between July 2009 and March 2012. The programme linked schools and education authorities in Katine sub-county and Soroti District in Uganda with schools in Sheffield, England. The programme aimed "to challenge stereotypical attitudes among young people in Africa and the UK, broaden the international view of young people in both continents and develop the skills of pupils and teachers."

See also
Education in Uganda
List of schools in Uganda

References

Secondary schools in Uganda
Serere District
Christian schools in Uganda
Educational institutions established in 1998
Boarding schools in Uganda
1998 establishments in Uganda